Mister Pizza is one of the largest chains of pizzerias in Brazil. The company was founded in 1981 by Mayer Ambar, Luiz Ambar, Álvaro Feio and Charles Saba.

Headquartered in Rio de Janeiro, there are more than 50 stores, distributed in several Brazilian states. Mister Pizza was the first franchiser in the business of foodservice in the country, the first franchise was opened in 1983 in Brasília.

References

External links
 Official website 

Fast-food franchises
Fast-food chains of Brazil
Food and drink companies based in Rio de Janeiro (city)
Restaurants established in 1981
Brazilian brands
Pizzerias